Ninski Stanovi  is a village in Croatia.

Populated places in Zadar County